The Voineșița is a left tributary of the river Lotru in Romania. It discharges into the Lotru in the village Voineșița.

References

Rivers of Romania
Rivers of Vâlcea County